Naliya Air Force Station  of the Indian Air Force (IAF) is located in Naliya in Gujarat, India. It is not very far from the Pakistan India border.

History
It is home to No. 101 Squadron IAF  in India. It consists of 12 FBSU (Forward Base Supporting units) and MiG-21 Bison. Later it was upgraded to the 49th Wing in 2009.

Facilities
The airbase is situated at an elevation of 68 ft/21 m above mean sea level. It has one runway with concrete surfaces: 06/24 measuring 9000 by 148 feet (2,743 x 45 m).

References

Indian Air Force bases